Palo Alto Plantation is a historic plantation house located at Palopato, Onslow County, North Carolina. It was built between about 1836 and 1840, and is a two-story, five bay, double-pile frame dwelling with vernacular Federal and Greek Revival style design elements. It has a gable roof with cupola, two-tiered engaged porch, and Palladian windows on the gable ends.  It was the childhood home of Daniel L. Russell, Jr. (1845-1908), governor of North Carolina, 1897–1901.

It was listed on the National Register of Historic Places in 1979.

References

Plantation houses in North Carolina
Houses on the National Register of Historic Places in North Carolina
Federal architecture in North Carolina
Greek Revival houses in North Carolina
Houses completed in 1840
Houses in Onslow County, North Carolina
National Register of Historic Places in Onslow County, North Carolina